Simbali is a Papuan language spoken in East New Britain Province on the island of New Britain, Papua New Guinea. It is spoken in Avungi village of Lassul Baining Rural LLG and Kavudemki village of Sinivit Rural LLG.

References

Languages of East New Britain Province
Baining languages